The 2003 Men's EuroHockey Nations Championship qualification was the seventh and last edition of the qualifying round for the Men's EuroHockey Nations Championship. It took place from 8 July to 15 September 2002 in four different venues with 21 teams playing for seven quotas at the 2003 European Championship.

Spain qualified directly as the hosts while Belgium, England, Germany and the Netherlands qualified by their position in the 1999 European Championship.

Tournament 1

The first tournament was played from 8 to 14 July 2002 in Poznań, Poland with seven teams participating.

Preliminary round

Pool A

Pool B

Fifth to seventh place classification

5–7th place semi-final

Fifth place game

First to fourth place classification

Semi-finals

Third place game

Final

Final standings

Tournament 2

The second tournament was held in Dublin, Ireland from 8 to 14 July 2002 with eight teams participating.

Preliminary round

Pool A

Pool B

Fifth to eighth place classification

5–8th place semi-finals

Seventh place game

Fifth place game

First to fourth place classification

Semi-finals

Third place game

Final

Final standings

(H) Host.

Tournament 3

The third tournament was held in Moscow, Russia from 8 to 14 July 2002 with six teams participating.

Standings

Results

Play-off

The play-off tournament was held in Terrassa, Spain from 13 to 15 September 2002 with three teams participating.

Standings

Results

References

Qualification
Men's EuroHockey Nations Championship qualification
EuroHockey Nations Championship qualification
EuroHockey Nations Championship qualification
EuroHockey Nations Championship qualification
EuroHockey Nations Championship qualification
EuroHockey Nations Championship qualification
EuroHockey Nations Championship qualification
EuroHockey Nations Championship qualification
2002 EuroHockey Nations Championship qualification
2002 EuroHockey Nations Championship qualification
2002 EuroHockey Nations Championship qualification
2002 EuroHockey Nations Championship qualification
Sport in Poznań
20th century in Poznań
Sports competitions in Moscow
EuroHockey Nations Championship qualification
International sports competitions in Dublin (city)
2000s in Dublin (city)
Sport in Terrassa